Greece has participated in the Eurovision Young Dancers 8 times since its debut in 1993.

Participation overview

See also
Greece in the Eurovision Song Contest
Greece in the Eurovision Young Musicians

External links 
 Eurovision Young Dancers

Countries in the Eurovision Young Dancers